Events from the year 1651 in Ireland.

Events
January – Edmund Ludlow lands in Ireland as lieutenant-general of horse and second-in-command to Henry Ireton.
June – restart of the siege of Limerick by English Parliamentarian troops under Ireton.
July – Battle of Knocknaclashy. Irish force trying to relieve Limerick is routed.
August – start of the siege of Galway: an English Parliamentarian army under Charles Coote blockades the city.
October 27 – siege of Limerick: Hugh Dubh O'Neill surrenders Limerick after part of the English Royalist garrison mutinies. The soldiers are permitted to march unarmed to Galway but some leaders are executed.
November 26 – Henry Ireton dies of fever and is succeeded in command by Edmund Ludlow.

Births

Deaths
October 31 – executions by the English Parliamentarians after the surrender of Limerick:
Terence Albert O'Brien, Roman Catholic Bishop of Emly (b.1600)
Dominic Fanning, Alderman.
November 26 – Henry Ireton , English Parliamentarian commander (b.1611)
Richard Butler, 3rd Viscount Mountgarret, landowner and former Irish Confederate military commander (b.1578)

References

 
1650s in Ireland
Ireland
Years of the 17th century in Ireland